The 1909 Georgia Bulldogs football team represented the Georgia Bulldogs of the University of Georgia during the 1909 college football season. The Bulldogs completed the season with a 1–4–2 record.  The offensive production was quite low, with only 14 points being scored over the course of seven games.  The only victory was over Tennessee.  Georgia suffered its fifth straight loss to Georgia Tech and also lost to rivals Clemson and Auburn. In 1909, the team had an unusual situation with the first-ever co-head coaches at Georgia, James Coulter & Frank Dobson.  1909 was the only year either of them served as head coach at Georgia.

The first decade of the 1900s was not kind to Georgia.  The Bulldogs played 70 games and had a losing record of 24–38–8, a winning percentage of just .400.  This decade was the worst decade in Georgia football history.  There were also seven different head coaches during the ten-year period.

Schedule

Sources
 Reed, Thomas Walter (1949). Athens, Georgia: University of Georgia Press. History of the University of Georgia; Chapter XVII: Athletics at the University from the Beginning Through 1947 imprint pages 3496–3497

References

Georgia
Georgia Bulldogs football seasons
Georgia Bulldogs football